Schifflange railway station is a railway station serving Schifflange, in south-western Luxembourg.  It is operated by Chemins de Fer Luxembourgeois, the state-owned railway company.

The station is situated on Line 60, which connects Luxembourg City to the Red Lands of the south of the country.

External links
 Official CFL page on Schifflange station
 Rail.lu page on Schifflange station

Railway station
Railway stations in Luxembourg
Railway stations on CFL Line 60